Polylopha cassiicola is a species of moth of the family Tortricidae. It is found in China (Guangdong and Hong Kong).

The larvae feed on Cinnamomum species.

References

Moths described in 1993
Polyorthini